The Zelvyanka is a river in Belarus, a left tributary of the river Neman.

The river starts from a place between villages Lidzyany (Лідзяны, Лидяны) and Kulyavichy (Кулявічы, Кулёвичи) in Svislach district and further flows through Hrodna Voblast and Brest Voblast (Vawkavysk district, Pruzhany district, Zel’va district, Masty district).

Tributaries: Shchyba, Ruzhanka, Ivanawka, Sasva, Samarawka, Yukhnawka.

Settlements: Masty (by the mouth), Zelva, Papernya.

References

Rivers of Brest Region
Rivers of Grodno Region
Rivers of Belarus